The 1941 municipal election was held November 12, 1941 to elect a mayor and five aldermen to sit on Edmonton City Council and four trustees to sit on the public school board, while four trustees were acclaimed to the separate school board.

There were ten aldermen on city council, but five of the positions were already filled: James Ogilvie, Sidney Bowcott, Athelstan Bissett (SS), Sidney Parsons, and Frederick John Mitchell were all elected to two-year terms in 1940 and were still in office.

There were seven trustees on the public school board, but three of the positions were already filled: Izena Ross, E M Gunderson, and W G McConachie had been acclaimed to two-year terms in 1940 and were still in office.  The same was true of the separate board, where Adrien Crowe (SS), James O’Hara, and J O Pilon were continuing.

Voter turnout

There were 17,566 ballots cast out of 56,808 eligible voters, for a voter turnout of 30.9%.

Results

 bold or  indicates elected
 italics indicate incumbent
 "SS", where data is available, indicates representative for Edmonton's South Side, with a minimum South Side representation instituted after the city of Strathcona, south of the North Saskatchewan River, amalgamated into Edmonton on February 1, 1912.

Mayor

Aldermen

Public school trustees

Separate (Catholic) school trustees

William Wilde (SS), Robert Tighe, Thomas Malone, and Romeo Bouchard were acclaimed.

References

Election History, City of Edmonton: Elections and Census Office

1941
1941 elections in Canada
1941 in Alberta